Marjorie Boyce Kemp (1886 – 20 April 1975) was a Scottish stained-glass artist who studied under Margaret Chilton in Glasgow, and eventually set up a studio in Edinburgh with her. This is a list of her major works excluding collaborations with Margaret Chilton, which are listed under List of works by Margaret Chilton. After Chilton's death, Kemp retired from stained-glass work and died in Edinburgh on the 20 April 1975.

Works in Parish Churches

References

1886 births
1975 deaths
British stained glass artists and manufacturers
20th-century Scottish women artists
People from Blairgowrie and Rattray
Alumni of the Glasgow School of Art